Diego Florez Bardanca (born March 20, 1993) is a professional footballer who plays as a center-back for Thai League 1 club Chonburi, on loan from Buriram United. Born in Spain, he represents the Philippines national team.

Club career
Born in León, Bardanca started his career with Galician side Deportivo La Coruña, before moving to Real Valladolid, where he spent time with the club's 'B' team and was tipped as a promising young player.

SJK
After spending time with various other Spanish lower division sides, Bardanca joined Finnish side Seinäjoen Jalkapallokerho in 2017.

Bytovia Bytów
In 2019, Bardanca signed a six-month contract with I liga club Bytovia Bytów.

Inđija
On 20 July 2019, he signed a contract with Serbian side FK Inđija. He was released at the end of 2019. His only appearance for the club was a two-minute cameo in a round of 32 fixture in the 2019–20 Serbian Cup.

Gorica
On 6 February 2020, he signed for ND Gorica until the end of the 2019–20 season. In August 2020, he extended his contract until the end of the 2020–21 season.

Puszcza Niepołomice
On 23 July 2021, he returned to Poland and signed with I liga side Puszcza Niepołomice on a one-year deal. He left the club by mutual consent on 2 November 2021.

Buriram United
In February 2022, he joined Thai League 1 club Buriram United.

International career
Bardanca is eligible to represent Spain at international level, and is also eligible to play for the Philippines due to his grandmother being born in the country.

Philippines
In 2019, it was reported that Bardanca received an invitation to train with the Philippines.

In June 2019, Bardanca received his first call-up for the Philippines in a friendly against China, but eventually did not take part due to eligibility constraints.

Bardanca was included in the 25-man squad of the Philippines for 2022 FAS Tri-Nations Series.

He debuted in a 2–0 friendly loss to Malaysia on 23 March 2022.

Career statistics

Club

International

References

External links
 
 

1993 births
Living people
Sportspeople from León, Spain
Footballers from Castile and León
Philippines international footballers
Filipino footballers
Spanish footballers
Spanish people of Filipino descent
Filipino people of Spanish descent
Citizens of the Philippines through descent
Association football defenders
Seinäjoen Jalkapallokerho players
Bytovia Bytów players
FK Inđija players
ND Gorica players
PFC Lokomotiv Tashkent players
Puszcza Niepołomice players
Diego Bardanca
Veikkausliiga players
I liga players
Serbian SuperLiga players
Slovenian Second League players
Slovenian PrvaLiga players
Uzbekistan Super League players
Filipino expatriate footballers
Filipino expatriate sportspeople in Finland
Expatriate footballers in Finland
Filipino expatriate sportspeople in Poland
Expatriate footballers in Poland
Filipino expatriate sportspeople in Serbia
Expatriate footballers in Serbia
Filipino expatriate sportspeople in Slovenia
Expatriate footballers in Slovenia
Filipino expatriate sportspeople in Uzbekistan
Expatriate footballers in Uzbekistan
Filipino expatriate sportspeople in Thailand
Expatriate footballers in Thailand
Real Valladolid Promesas players
Atlético Onubense players
CD Eldense footballers
Atlético Levante UD players
Real Jaén footballers
UD Ibiza players
Gimnástica de Torrelavega footballers
Tercera División players
Segunda División B players
Spanish expatriate footballers
Spanish expatriate sportspeople in Finland
Spanish expatriate sportspeople in Poland
Spanish expatriate sportspeople in Serbia
Spanish expatriate sportspeople in Slovenia
Spanish expatriate sportspeople in Uzbekistan
Spanish sportspeople of Asian descent